is a 1990 Japanese-language film, released on July 21, 1990. It was filmed by Pacific Link Communications Japan, the Fuji Television Network, and by David Hannay Productions. Lasting 110 minutes, the film had Kunie Tanaka and Hiroko Yakushimaru as the starring roles. The movie was filmed in Australia, with filming starting in the Southern Hemisphere's winter of 1989.

The soundtrack to the film was released on July 21, 1990, by Joe Hisaishi, who composed the music for the film.

Plot
A sixth-grade elementary school student, Shoichi, visits his divorced father who lives in Australia after retiring from a leading Japanese company and has become obsessed with finding the extinct Tasmanian Tiger. Shoichi had run away from home. At first, he travels to Sydney looking for his father but finds him in the beautiful southern island of Tasmania.

Reception
The film made  at the Japanese box office, and was the recipient of the eight Golden Gross Award "Silver Excellence" award given out by the Association of Environmental Health. A DVD of the film was released on November 21, 2001; it was released exclusively in Japan.

Staff
 Director: Yasuo Furuhata
 Music: Joe Hisaishi
 Theme: Hiroyuki Izuta ("In Your Eyes")
 Executive Producer: Hiroaki Shikanai
 Producer: Hisashi Hieda
 Planning: Yasushi Mitsui
 Executive Producer: Koichi Murakami, Toshikazu Horiguchi
 Producer: Shinya Kawai, Satoshi Kiyoshi Ichiko, Charles Hannah
 Producer: Hideshi Miyajima
 Produced by Fuji Television Network, Inc.
 Distribution: Toho

Video game

In the Game Boy action video game based on the film, the divorced father is looking for a Tasmanian tiger while trying to survive in the harsh wilderness of Tasmania. Players can choose between two "types" of levels; slow levels or fast levels. Either jumping on the enemies or using the bombs kills them instantly. Players are limited in the number of bombs that they receive in the game. Certain enemies are worth more than others when defeated. Other animals like koalas appear in the game as bonus characters. However, these bonus creatures tend to disappear very quickly.

This game is a port of Pony Canyon's Fruit Panic for the MSX which plays similar to the classic arcade game Mappy. All plants must be collected and animals must be cleared off the level before players can begin the next level; there are approximately ten levels in this game. While the "A" button is used to plant bombs on the screen; the "Select" button is used to choose the level (and make the Tasmanian tiger either slower or faster). It is possible to stun the Tasmanian tiger with a bomb attack.

References

External links
Tasmania Story at MobyGames
Tasmania Story at The Game Boy Database
Box art comparison at djvenomnyc.com

1990 films
Films scored by Joe Hisaishi
Films set in Tasmania
Japanese drama films